Evelyn Shirley may refer to:

Evelyn Shirley (1788–1856), Member of Parliament (MP)
Evelyn Shirley (1812–1882), MP, son of the above